Christabel is a four-part British drama series first shown on BBC2 between 16 November and 7 December 1988.

It is based on the memoirs of Christabel Bielenberg, an English woman married to a German lawyer during World War II. The screenplay was written by Dennis Potter, and was directed by Adrian Shergold. Each episode runs around 65 minutes. It stars Elizabeth Hurley in one of her earliest leading roles.

Part of the series was filmed at the disused Camperdown Works jute mill complex in Dundee, which doubled for 1940s Berlin. Other scenes were filmed in Hungary and Austria.

Synopsis
An Englishwoman's love for a German lawyer is at the heart of one of the most extraordinary stories of the Second World War.  Christabel Burton's aspiration of living in harmony with her husband Peter Bielenberg is shattered when Germany slips into the full horror of the Nazi regime and war is declared.  Life for Christabel and Peter becomes a fight to survive, a struggle to hold on to human decency.

In the first episode, as wedding bells peal out across the English countryside, the bride's father is begging her to change her mind.  The village congregation is shocked when the bridegroom responds in German.  But Christabel insists on making an "impossible decision" – a commitment to married life in a country soon to be at war with her own.

Cast

Home media
A shortened film version (of the TV series), running time approximately 2 hours, was released as a DVD by Guillotine Films in 2004.

References

External links
 

1988 British television series debuts
1988 British television series endings
1980s British drama television series
BBC television dramas
Television shows written by Dennis Potter
1980s British television miniseries
English-language television shows